The Percy L. Julian Award was first given in 1975 by the National Organization for the Professional Advancement of Black Chemists and Chemical Engineers (NOBCChE). The award is given every one to two years. It honors black scientists who have made significant contributions to the areas of pure or applied research in science or engineering.

The award is named to honor chemist Percy Lavon Julian. In becoming director of research of a division in the Glidden Company of Chicago, Julian was the first African-American to lead a research group in a major corporation.  He later founded Julian Laboratories,  Julian Associates, Inc. and the Julian Research Institute.

Awardees

See also 

 List of general science and technology awards

References

Science and technology awards
Awards honoring African Americans